Punaauia is a commune in the suburbs of Papeete in French Polynesia, an overseas territory of France in the Pacific Ocean. Punaauia is located on the island of Tahiti, in the administrative subdivision of the Windward Islands, themselves part of the Society Islands. In the late 1890s, the French painter Paul Gauguin lived in Punaauia. Here he painted his masterpiece Where Do We Come From? What Are We? Where Are We Going?. The commune borders Faaā on the north and Pāea on the south.

History
Like many of the other communes and islands of French Polynesia, the area was first settled by early Polynesians from Asia around 1,000 years ago.  These people have already settled on the Marquesas Islands and then they traveled on their sea canoes to the Society Islands. They had lived off of the fish and fruits of Tahiti. Most of the early Polynesians had built houses on the beach. Later on, they had built houses further inland because of high tide.

Captain James Cook came on his expedition to chart the Pacific islands during 1770. He also came with explorer Englishman Samuel Wallis to explore. James Cook later went to Australia. Charles Darwin came to the Society Islands in the 1800s from the western Pacific. Punaauia experienced a major population boom in the late 1990s. At the 2017 census it had a population of 28,103, making it the second most populous commune in French Polynesia.

Geography

Climate
Punaauia has a tropical monsoon climate (Köppen climate classification Am).

Transport
The Aremiti ferry is the main ferry that sails to Moorea and a few other Society Islands. The ferry is white with red stripes. The other is the Moorea Ferry which is white on the top and blue on the bottom.

Twin towns – sister cities

Punaauia is twinned with:
 Dumbéa, New Caledonia

References

 
Communes of French Polynesia